The 465th Tactical Training Squadron is an inactive United States Air Force unit.  During World War II as the 465th Bombardment Squadron, it was an operational and replacement unit from 1942 to 1944, when it was disbanded in a general reorganization of Army Air Forces training and support units in the United States.  The squadron was
reconstituted as the 465th Tactical Fighter Training Squadron in 1973 and briefly operated the General Dynamics F-111 Aardvark at Cannon Air Force Base, New Mexico. It moved to Holloman Air Force Base, New Mexico and operated as a fighter and academic training unit until inactivating in 1991.

History

World War II

The 27th Bombardment Group had engaged in combat in the Southwest Pacific Theater, both in the air with Douglas A-24 Banshees and on ground as infantry in the Philippines.  In May 1942, the group and its three squadrons were withdrawn from the theater and moved on paper to Key Field, Mississippi, where it began reforming as a Douglas A-20 Havoc unit.  To bring the group to its full strength, the squadron was activated in July 1942 as the 465th Bombardment Squadron. In addition to A-20s, the squadron also was assigned a few DB-7 export versions of the Havoc

In the fall of 1942, the 27th Group prepared for movement to North Africa, but would be converted to a fighter-bomber unit flying North American A-36 Apaches.  Because Army Air Forces (AAF) fighter-bomber groups were assigned only three squadrons, when the group moved overseas in late November 1942, the 465th was reassigned to III Air Support Command, and became an Operational Training Unit (OTU).  The OTU program involved the use of an oversized parent unit to provide cadres  to "satellite groups".

In January 1943, the squadron moved to Alachua Army Air Field, Florida, where it became part of the Army Air Forces School of Applied Tactics.  In addition to training cadres for newly-formed groups it also demonstrated tactics for light bomber units as part of the 415th Bombardment Group.  In March 1944 the group moved to Dalhart Army Air Field, Texas, where it became a Replacement Training Unit.  Replacement Training Units were similar to OTUs in that they were oversized units, but their mission was to train individual pilots or aircrews.  However, even as the squadron arrived at Dalhart, the AAF was finding that standard military units, based on relatively inflexible tables of organization were not proving well adapted to the training mission.  Accordingly, a more functional system was adopted in which each base was organized into a separate numbered unit.  The 415th Group, including the squadron, and support units at Dalhart were disbanded, and their personnel and equipment were reorganized as the 232d AAF Base Unit.

Tactical Air Command

In the fall of 1972, the squadron was reconstituted as the 465th Tactical Fighter Training Squadron and reactivated on 1 December at Cannon Air Force Base, New Mexico, where it trained crews on the General Dynamics F-111 Aardvark as part of the 27th Tactical Fighter Wing.  This mission lasted only eight months, and in August 1973, the squadron moved to Holloman Air Force Base, New Mexico, where it conducted lead in fighter training with the Northrop AT-38 under the 49th Tactical Fighter Wing.  In January 1977, flying training activities at Holloman were put under the newly-activated 479th Tactical Training Wing.  The squadron was transferred to the 479th Wing, where it performed the academic training portion of the wing's mission.  It continued this mission until it was inactivated in 1991, when its mission, personnel and equipment was transferred to the 435th Tactical Training Squadron.

Lineage
 Constituted 465th Bombardment Squadron (Light) on 7 July 1942
 Activated on 13 July 1942
 Disbanded on 5 April 1944
 Reconstituted on 27 October 1972 and redesignated 465th Tactical Fighter Training Squadron
 Activated 1 December 1972
 Redesignated 465th Tactical Training Squadron on 1 January 1977
 Inactivated on 19 February 1991

Assignments
 27th Bombardment Group, 13 July 1942
 III Air Support Command, 21 November 1942
 Army Air Forces School of Applied Tactics, c. 22 January 1943
 415th Bombardment Group, 23 March 1943 – 5 April 1944
 27th Tactical Fighter Wing, 1 December 1972
 49th Tactical Fighter Wing, 1 August 1973
 479th Tactical Training Wing, 1 January 1977 – 19 February 1991

Stations
 Key Field, Mississippi, 13 July 1942
 Hattiesburg Army Air Field, Mississippi, 15 August 1942
 Harding Army Air Field, Louisiana, 26 October 1942
 Alachua Army Air Field, Florida, 24 January 1943
 Montbrook Army Air Field, Florida, c. 19 November 1943
 Orlando Army Air Base, Florida, 2 March 1944
 Dalhart Army Air Field, Texas, 19 March-5 April 1944
 Cannon Air Force Base, New Mexico, 1 December 1972
 Holloman Air Force Base, New Mexico, 1 August 1973 – 19 February 1991

Aircraft
 Douglas DB-7 Boston, 1942.
 Douglas A-20 Havoc, 1942-1944
 General Dynamics F-111 Aardvark, 1972-1973
 Northrop AT-38 Talon, 1973-1977

Awards and campaigns

See also

 List of United States Air Force fighter squadrons
 List of Douglas A-20 Havoc operators

References

Notes
 Explanatory notes

 Citations

Bibliography

 
 
 
 
 
 

Training squadrons of the United States Air Force
American Theater of World War II
Military units and formations of the United States in the Cold War